Poland Fair Play was a Polish centre-right non-partisan local government movement founded on 2 March 2019 by Robert Gwiazdowski for the 2019 European Parliament election. Subsequently, the party was dissolved on 4 June 2019.

Fair Play Country
On 13 December 2019, a few former politicians of Poland Fair Play led by Jolanta Milas founded the Fair Play Country Association (Państwo Fair Play), as part of the Polish Coalition. Fair Play Country Association is an official member of the council of Polish Coalition and it is unofficially supported by Robert Gwiazdowski.

References

Organizations established in 2019
Organisations based in Warsaw
European Parliament elections in Poland
Political organisations based in Poland
Political parties established in 2019
Political parties disestablished in 2019